Melting Millions may refer to:
 Melting Millions (1927 serial), an American adventure film serial
 Melting Millions (1917 film), an American silent comedy film